Bunmi may refer to:

Name
Bunmi Banjo, technology leadership and future of work speaker and adviser
Bunmi Dipo Salami (born 1967), Nigerian feminist
Bunmi Famosaya, Mni (born 1956), Nigerian government officer
Bunmi Kayode (born 1985), Nigerian footballer
Bunmi Makinwa (born 1955), Chief Executive Officer of AUNIQUEI
Bunmi Mojekwu, English actress
Bunmi Olatunji (born 1977), American psychologist
Bunmi Olaye, founder of Bunmi Koko
Bunmi Rotimi (born 1995), American football player

Other
Bunmi Koko, fashion brand